Richard Gravesend (died 1303) was a medieval Bishop of London.

Life

Gravesend held the prebend of Totenhall in the diocese of London. He may have been Archdeacon of Essex and possibly Archdeacon of Northampton, but the identifications are not secure.

Gravesend was elected about 7 May, confirmed 17 May and consecrated on 11 August 1280. He was enthroned in London on 1 October 1280.

Gravesend died on 9 December 1303.

Citations

References

External links

 

Gravesend, Richard
Gravesend, Richard
Year of birth unknown
13th-century English Roman Catholic bishops